Sabodala is an arrondissement of Saraya  in Kédougou Region in Senegal.

References 

Arrondissements of Senegal